Morteza Aghatehrani is an Iranian Shia cleric and conservative politician. He was former secretary-general of the Front of Islamic Revolution Stability, and represented Tehran, Rey, Shemiranat and Eslamshahr in the Parliament of Iran from 2008 to 2016.

A protégé of Mohammad Taqi Mesbah Yazdi, he was the "morality teacher" of the cabinet of Mahmoud Ahmadinejad.

Aghatehrani he was formerly Imam of 'Islamic Institute of New York', a Shia mosque located in New York City.

Education 
Aghatehrani went to Canada to pursue his graduate studies at McGill University, before gaining a PhD in Middle East Studies from State University of New York at Binghamton and defending a thesis entitled "Khajah Nasir al-Din Tusi on the Meta-Mysticism of Ibn Sina" in 2000.

Controversy 
In 2012, it stirred controversy when it was revealed that Aghatehrani holds a Green card, tantamount to permanent residency status in the United States, while he is often regarded "strongly anti-foreign".

References 

 Profile at Iranian Parliament 

1957 births
Living people
Deputies of Tehran, Rey, Shemiranat and Eslamshahr
McGill University alumni
Binghamton University alumni
Members of the 8th Islamic Consultative Assembly
Members of the 9th Islamic Consultative Assembly
Members of the 11th Islamic Consultative Assembly
Front of Islamic Revolution Stability politicians
Secretaries-General of political parties in Iran
Imams in North America
Iranian expatriates in Canada
Iranian expatriates in the United States
Shia clerics from Isfahan